Blown Away is a Canadian reality glassblowing competition television series that premiered on the Canadian channel Makeful before a subsequent release on the streaming platform Netflix. The 10-episode first season was released on July 12, 2019. The series is filmed in Canada and is produced by Marblemedia.

Casting for a second season was announced in November 2019. Season 2 was released on Netflix in January 2021. A four-episode Christmas series was released in November 2021.  Season 3 premiered July 22, 2022.

The contestants on the show are 10 glassblowers. Katherine Gray, an artist and associate professor at California State University, San Bernardino, is the chief judge, and Nick Uhas, a former Big Brother USA contestant and science YouTuber, hosts the show. The winner receives a prize package worth the equivalent of $60,000, including an artist residency at the Corning Museum of Glass. The first season was filmed in a converted warehouse in Hamilton, Ontario, a facility that was "custom-built to accommodate 10 glass blowers working simultaneously". Industry experts from the Craft and Design Glass Studio at Sheridan College, Pilchuck Glass School, and the Corning Museum of Glass consulted the producers during the construction of the facility and provide advice and evaluation to the contestants each round.

Contestants

Season 1

Season 2

Blown Away: Christmas

Season 3

Episodes

Season 1 (2019)
{{Episode table |background=#000000 |overall= |season= |title= |airdate= |airdateR= |country=Canada |episodes= 

{{Episode list
 |EpisodeNumber   = 7
 |EpisodeNumber2  = 7
 |Title           = Dual Intent
 |OriginalAirDate = 
 |ShortSummary    = Guest evaluator: Catherine Osborne, former editor-in-chief of the architecture and design magazine Azure
 |LineColor       = 000000
}}

}}

Season 2 (2021)

Blown Away: Christmas (2021)

 Season 3 (2022) 

 Results
Season 1

Season 2

Blown Away: Christmas

Season 3

Colour key:

 Artist got through to the next round.
 Artist was eliminated.
 Artist was the Best in Blow.
 Artist was a series runner-up.
 Artist was the series winner.

 Reception Blown Away received a positive review from Joel Keller of Decider who compared it to Top Chef and The Great British Bake Off. The Fader'' praised the series as rising above other competition shows and being educational.

Awards

References

External links
 
 

English-language Netflix original programming
2010s Canadian reality television series
2019 Canadian television series debuts
2020s Canadian reality television series
Television shows set in Canada
Glass art
Television series about art
Reality competition television series
Television series by Blue Ant Studios